Halmstad Municipality (Halmstads kommun) is a municipality in Halland County on the Swedish west coast, in which the city Halmstad is the seat.

The 1971 local government reform was implemented gradually in the area. In 1967 the rural municipality Simlångsdalen (created in 1952) was amalgamated into the City of Halmstad. The city was converted into a municipality of unitary type in 1971, but the seven surrounding municipalities were not merged into it until 1974.

Politics
Since the 2022 elections, the municipal government is controlled by a majority consisting of the Social Democrats, Moderates and Christian Democrats, with Social Democrat Stefan Pålsson as chairman of the municipal board.

Municipal council

The municipal council has 71 seats, with the governing majority holding a majority with 40 seats.

  Left Party (4)
  Social Democrats (22)
  Green Party (2)
  Hjärta för Halmstad (4)
  Halmstads Lokala Parti (2)
  Centre Party (5)
  Liberals (3)
  Moderate Party (13)
  Christian Democrats (5)
  Sweden Democrats (11)

Localities 
There are 21 urban areas (also called a tätort or locality) in Halmstad Municipality.

In the table the localities are listed according to the size of the population as of 31 December 2005. The municipal seat is in bold characters.

See also 
University College of Halmstad
Hallandsposten
Swedish Army
Swedish Air Force

References 

Statistics Sweden

External links 

Halmstad Municipality - Official site

 
Halmstad
Municipalities of Halland County